Van Buren Township is one of the fifteen townships of Putnam County, Ohio, United States.  The 2000 census found 3,128 people in the township, 721 of whom lived in the unincorporated portions of the township.

Geography
Located in the northeastern corner of the county, it borders the following townships:
Bartlow Township, Henry County - north
Jackson Township, Wood County - northeast corner
Pleasant Township, Hancock County - east
Blanchard Township, Hancock County - southeast corner
Blanchard Township - south
Ottawa Township - southwest corner
Liberty Township - west
Marion Township, Henry County - northwest corner

Two villages are located in Van Buren Township: Belmore in the northern part of the township, and Leipsic in the western part of the township.

Name and history

The township was surveyed in 1821, but not organized until 1843. (Before organization it had been known as North Blanchard.) The swampiness of the land and "masses of fallen timbers" were the primary reasons for its slow settlement.  Abraham Baughman was the township's first settler, moving there in 1835.  In 1850, the population was 172, rising to 608 by 1860 (768 if Leipsic is included). Most of the early residents were farmers but a significant number were occupied as railroad laborers (over 30 in 1860).

Statewide, other Van Buren Townships are located in Darke, Hancock, and Shelby counties.

Government
The township is governed by a three-member board of trustees, who are elected in November of odd-numbered years to a four-year term beginning on the following January 1. Two are elected in the year after the presidential election and one is elected in the year before it. There is also an elected township fiscal officer, who serves a four-year term beginning on April 1 of the year after the election, which is held in November of the year before the presidential election. Vacancies in the fiscal officership or on the board of trustees are filled by the remaining trustees.

References

External links
Putnam County website

Townships in Putnam County, Ohio
Townships in Ohio